Teresita Tan Sy-Coson (born October 1950) is a Filipina businesswoman, the daughter of Henry Sy. The vice chairman of SM Investments Corporation (SMIC)—one of the Philippines' largest publicly-traded holding companies with interests in retail, banking, property and portfolio investments, She is also the chairman of BDO Unibank, Inc. (BDO), the Philippines' largest bank in terms of total resources, capital, loans, total deposits, and assets-under-management as of the end of 2015.

Career
Apart from these two key positions, Sy-Coson also holds important board and management positions in various subsidiaries and affiliates of BDO and the SM Group. These include BDO Private Bank, Inc.; BDO Leasing and Finance, Inc.; BDO Capital & Investment Corporation; and BDO Foundation, Inc. For the SM Group side, she is an integral figure as adviser to the Board of SM Prime Holdings, Inc. She is also part of the three-member Philippine delegation to the ASEAN Business Advisory Council (ABAC), an organization formed in 2003 by the leaders of ASEAN to provide private sector feedback and guidance to boost the alliance's efforts towards economic integration.

Awards and recognition
Over the years, Sy-Coson has been a recipient of various awards in recognition of her leadership in the banking and retail sectors.

These recognitions include an Asia's Best CEO award and an Asian Corporate Director of the Year award, both from Corporate Governance Asia; being named 2012's Best Retail Banker of the Year by The Asian Banker; being listed in Fortune magazine's 50 Most Powerful Women in the World from 2001 to 2010; being included in Forbes Asia's list of the 50 Power Business Women; and being a recipient of the Philippine Retailers Association (PRA) President's Award in 2014.

Personal life
Sy Coson was married to a Filipino Chinese businessman Louis Coson, who died in 2003.

References

1950 births
Living people
20th-century Filipino businesspeople
Filipino people of Chinese descent
Filipino women in business
People from Plaridel, Bulacan
Tagalog people
Assumption University (Worcester) alumni
People named in the Pandora Papers
21st-century Filipino businesspeople